Willem Cornelis Janse van Rensburg (16 May 1818 – 13 August 1865) was the second President of the Executive Council of the South African Republic, from 18 April 1862 until 10 May 1864.

Life 
He was born near the town of Beaufort West, the son of Hendrik Janse van Rensburg and his second wife, Martha Magdalena Oosthuizen. Janse van Rensburg married Elizabeth Maria Jacoba du Plessis in 1838. Initially, he travelled with a party of Voortrekkers to Natal, and was one of the party of Janse van Rensburgs who survived an attack by a group of Zulus at Rensburg koppie (Rensburg hill). He subsequently travelled to the Transvaal and settled on a farm in the Rustenburg area in 1848.

During this period there was a major political conflict between the South African Republic's (ZAR) first president and writer of its constitution, Marthinus Wessel Pretorius, and its commandant-general, Stephanus Schoeman, who rejected the constitution. Janse van Rensburg supported Schoeman and in return, the latter appointed Janse van Rensburg as a provisional commandant. Janse van Rensburg subsequently represented Schoeman in negotiations with Pretorius's faction. In 1858, when Schoeman fell ill, Janse van Rensburg was appointed as acting commandant-general.

Janse van Rensburg went on to play an essential role in uniting the former Lydenburg Republic with the ZAR and also supported Pretorius when he tried to unite the ZAR and the Orange Free State. In February 1860, during Pretorius's absence, the  offered Janse van Rensburg the post of State President, which he refused. Following substantial political maneuvering, Janse van Rensburg was elected as the second president of the ZAR in April 1863. However, Janse van Rensburg refused to be sworn in and a second election had to be held. During this election Janse van Rensburg received 1,106 votes and Pretorius 1,065; Janse van Rensburg accepted his election this time and he took his oath of office on 23 October 1863.

Pretorius's supporters did not support the results of the election and what amounted to the Transvaal Civil War broke out. When the fighting came to a halt in January 1864, another presidential election was held and Pretorius was re-elected; he was sworn in on 9 May 1864. Janse van Rensburg subsequently returned to his farm near Rustenburg, where he died and was buried shortly afterwards. However, in August 1974, Janse van Rensburg and his wife were disinterred and reburied at the Heroes' Acre Cemetery in Pretoria.

References

External links 
 

19th-century South African politicians
1818 births
1865 deaths
Afrikaner people
People from the Central Karoo District Municipality
Presidents of the South African Republic
South African people of Dutch descent